The 2017–18 Illinois Fighting Illini men's basketball team represented the University of Illinois at Urbana–Champaign in the 2017–18 NCAA Division I men's basketball season. Led by first-year head coach Brad Underwood, the Illini played their home games at State Farm Center in Champaign, Illinois as members of the Big Ten Conference. They finished the season 14–18, 4–14 in Big Ten play to finish in a three-way tie for 11th place. As the No. 13 seed in the Big Ten tournament, they lost in the first round to Iowa.

Previous season
The Illini finished the 2016–17 season 20–15, 8–10 in Big Ten play to finish in ninth place. They lost in the second round of the Big Ten tournament to Michigan. They received an invitation to the National Invitation Tournament where they defeated Valparaiso and Boise State before losing in the quarterfinals to UCF.

On March 11, 2017, Illinois fired head coach John Groce. On March 18, the school hired Brad Underwood as the new head coach.

Offseason

Coaching changes
Following Brad Underwood's hiring as head coach, Jamall Walker was retained as an assistant. Underwood hired controversial former South Florida head coach Orlando Antigua who was fired as head coach from South Florida due to an NCAA investigation into academic violations. Underwood also hired Ron Coleman as an assistant and Stephen Gentry as assistant to the head coach.

Player departures

Decommits
On January 16, 2016, three-star shooting guard Javon Pickett of Belleville, Illinois verbally committed to attend Illinois in the fall of 2017. After the firing of John Groce, Pickett asked for and received a release of his letter of intent to Illinois. On November 17, 2016, four-star recruit Jeremiah Tilmon announced that he had signed his letter of intent with Illinois the  previous day, after a week of press uncertainty. However, after the coaching change at Illinois, Tilmon requested and received a release of his letter of intent with the school.

2017 recruiting class
During Illinois' final home game against Minnesota on February 28, 2016, Da'Monte Williams verbally committed to attend Illinois in the fall of 2017. Williams is the son of former Illinois guard Frank Williams  who led the Fighting Illini to three straight NCAA men's basketball tournament appearances, including an Elite Eight appearance in 2001. On November 9, 2016 Trent Frazier signed a national letter of intent after considering Memphis, Georgia, Kansas State and Seton Hall, among others. On April 27, 2017, four-star point guard Mark Smith, Mr. Illinois Basketball for 2017, announced he would attend Illinois. On June 12, Slovenian bigman Matic Vesel committed to Illinois.

Incoming transfers

2018 Recruiting class

Roster

Schedule and results
The 2018 Big Ten tournament was held at Madison Square Garden in New York City. Due to the Big East's use of that venue for their conference tournament, the Big Ten tournament took place one week earlier than usual, ending the week before Selection Sunday. As a result, the Big Ten regular season began in mid-December.

|-
!colspan=9 style="background:#; color:#;"|Exhibition

|-
!colspan=9 style="background:#; color:#;"|Regular season

|-
!colspan=9 style="background:#; color:#;"|Big Ten tournament

Awards and honors

In-season awards

Trent Frazier 
 Big Ten Freshman of the Week, December 26, 2017
 Big Ten Freshman of the Week, February 12, 2018

Postseason awards

Trent Frazier 
 All-Big Ten Honorable Mention (media)
 All-Big Ten Freshmen Team

Leron Black 
 All-Big Ten Honorable Mention (coaches and media)

References

2017–18 Big Ten Conference men's basketball season
2017-18
2018 in sports in Illinois
2017 in sports in Illinois